Diplocheilichthys jentinkii is a species of cyprinid in the genus Diplocheilichthys that inhabits Indonesia. Its habitat is fast-flowing waters.

References

 

Cyprinidae
Fish of Indonesia
Cyprinid fish of Asia
Taxa named by Canna Maria Louise Popta